Mark Edmundson is an American author and professor at the University of Virginia. He received a B.A from Bennington College in 1974 and a Ph.D from Yale University in 1985. Edmundson specializes in Romanticism, Poetry, and 19th-Century English and American Literature. He is the author of fifteen books, and his essays appear in The Wall Street Journal, The Atlantic, Harper's Magazine, The Chronicle of Higher Education, and The New York Times Magazine. Edmundson was awarded a Guggenheim Fellowship and was a National Endowment for the Humanities/Daniels Family Distinguished Teaching Professor at the University of Virginia.

Major Works

Self and Soul: A Defense of Ideals 
In Self and Soul: A Defense of Ideals (2015) Edmundson writes, "The profound stories about heroes and saints are passing from our minds." Michael Dirda of The Washington Post describes the book as "an impassioned critique of Western society, a relentless assault on contemporary complacency, shallowness, competitiveness and self-regard." Dirda notes that "Edmundson devotes the first half of 'Self and Soul' to several ancient exemplars of courage, compassion and contemplation, to those who, rejecting a safe and secure passage through life, consecrated themselves to some greater task."

The Heart of the Humanities: Reading, Writing, and Teaching 
The Heart of the Humanities: Reading, Writing, and Teaching (2018) is a collection of three earlier books: Why Read? (2004), Why Teach? In Defense of a Real Education (2013) and Why Write: A Master Class on the Art of Writing and Why it Matters (2016). In the Virginia Quarterly Review, Peter Walpole writes that Why Read? "argues passionately for a return, a rediscovery, of the possibilities great literature has to confront, challenge, and change the receptive reader. Edmundson's 1997 article for Harper's Magazine, "On the Uses of a Liberal Education: As Lite Entertainment for Bored College Students," appears in Why Read? and is one of his most controversial pieces. The Washington Post writes that the article "is said to be the most photocopied essay on college campuses over the last five years, presumably because what Edmundson said in it touched a sensitive nerve." Edmundson's 2007 essay, "Poetry Slam," was also controversial and inspired a response from Ben Lerner, who told The Paris Review that "Poetry Slam" was the reason he wrote his 2016 book, The Hatred of Poetry. Stephen Burt in the Boston Review defended "poets named by Edmundson" in the Harper's Magazine essay. Arthur Krystal defended "Poetry Slam" in his article, "The Missing Music in Today’s Poetry," published in The Chronicle of Higher Education: "I, too, am of Edmundson’s party, but my discontent is more site-specific, tonal rather than dispositive. Simply put: I miss what I used to enjoy." Kirkus Reviews writes that Why Teach? is an examination of "the slow transformation of universities and colleges from being driven by intellectual and cultural betterment to institutions modeled on business, with a complex, and not always successful, emphasis on attracting students and making a profit." Michael S. Roth of The New York Times writes, "If I meet any students heading to the University of Virginia, I will tell them to seek out Mark Edmundson, an English professor and the author of a new collection of essays called 'Why Teach?' For Mr. Edmundson, teaching is a calling, an urgent endeavor in which the lives — he says the souls — of students are at stake."

Teacher: The One Who Made the Difference and The Fine Wisdom and Perfect Teachings of the Kings of Rock and Roll 
Edmundson's two memoirs, Teacher: The One Who Made the Difference (2002), and The Fine Wisdom and Perfect Teachings of the Kings of Rock and Roll (2010), chronicle his early education at Medford High School (Massachusetts) and Bennington College. Teacher: The One Who Made the Difference, was a New York Times Notable Book of the Year and describes how "Edmundson's high school philosophy teacher, Franklin Lears, transformed Edmundson in one semester from a teenage thug into the sort of man who could grow up to be an English professor at the University of Virginia." Kirkus Reviews calls The Fine Wisdom and Perfect Teachings of the Kings of Rock and Roll a "near-perfect memoir," an "erudite, coming-of-age riot," in which Edmundson describes working as a taxi driver, stage-crew, and a bouncer in New York City.  In The Fine Wisdom and Perfect Teachings of the Kings of Rock and Roll, "the author revels in his renaissance-manliness—'how many other bouncers stand at the door of the discotheque and memorize Browning poems?'—and proves to be an honest, poetic and hilariously entertaining narrator."

Books 

 Song of Ourselves: Walt Whitman and the Fight for Democracy. Harvard University Press, 2021.
 The Heart of the Humanities: Reading, Writing, Teaching. Bloomsbury Publishing, 2018.
 Why Write? Bloomsbury Publishing, 2016.
 Self and Soul: A Defense of Ideals. Harvard University Press, 2015.
 Why Football Matters: My Education in the Game. Penguin Press, 2014 
 Why Teach? Bloomsbury Publishing, 2013.
 The Fine Wisdom and Perfect Teachings of the Kings of Rock and Roll. HarperCollins, 2010.
 The Death of Sigmund Freud. Bloomsbury Publishing, 2008.
 The Death of Sigmund Freud. Bloomsbury Publishing, 2007. Translations: French, German, Dutch, Chinese, Hebrew, Korean, Turkish, Portuguese (Brazil), Greek.
 Why Read? Bloomsbury Publishing, 2004.
 Teacher: The One Who Made the Difference. Random House, 2002.
 Nightmare on Main Street. Harvard University Press, 1997.
 Literature Against Philosophy, Plato to Derrida. Cambridge University Press, 1995.
 Wild Orchids and Trotsky (Editor). Penguin, 1993.
 Towards Reading Freud. Princeton University Press, 1990.

Selected Essays 

 "Truth Takes a Vacation." Harper's Magazine, January 2023.
 “What Emerson Can Teach Us About Resilience.” Wall Street Journal, June 18, 2021.
 “What Walt Whitman Knew about Democracy.” Wall Street Journal, April 15, 2021.       
 “On Great Literary Loves.” Lithub, April 9, 2021.  
 “Walt Whitman’s Guide to a Thriving Democracy.” The Atlantic Monthly, May 2019.
 “Why Does Love Got to Be So Sad?” Los Angeles Review of Books, Sept. 9. 2018.
 “Can Drugs Enlighten?” Raritan, Fall 2018.
 “Coleridge!” Literary Imagination, July, 2018.
 “The Metaphysics of the Hangover.” Hedgehog Review, Summer 2017.
 "My Perfect Season." Harper's Magazine, July 2016.
 "Profanity as Weltanschauung." Los Angeles Review of Books, December 29, 2015.
 "Test of Faith." American Scholar, Fall 2015.
 "The Idealist versus the Therapist." New York Times, August 18, 2015.
 "Football: The Lure of the Game." The Los Angeles Review of Books, Sept. 8, 2014.
 "The Gift." (fiction) Raritan, Fall 2014.
 "Pay Attention." The Hedgehog Review, Summer 2014.
 "Imagination: Powers and Perils." Raritan, Fall 2012.
 "Do Sports Build Character or Damage It?" The Chronicle of Higher Education, January 15, 2012.
 "Who Are You and What Are You Doing Here? / A Message in a Bottle for the Incoming Class" Oxford American, Fall 2011. Chosen for Best American Essays 2012.
 “Dwelling in Possibility.” The Chronicle of Higher Education, March 21, 2008.
 “Alone at the Movies.” The American Scholar, Winter, 2008.
 "Criticism Now: the Example of Wordsworth." Raritan, Fall, 1990.
 "Keats's Mortal Stance." Studies in Romanticism, Spring 1987.

Selected Television and Radio Appearances 

"Why Football Matters." C-SPAN, 2014.

"The Death of Sigmund Freud." C-SPAN, 2013.

"Author Argues College Offers More Training than Transformation." PBS NewsHour, 2012.

"Why Every Football Player should read Plato." PBS NewsHour, 2012.

"Why Every Student in America Should Read Henry David Thoreau's. 'Walden.'" PBS NewsHour, 2012.

"Why Teach?" C-SPAN, 2007.

"Why Read?" C-SPAN, 2004.

"Teacher Follow-Up." NPR, 2003.

References

Bennington College alumni
Yale University alumni
Living people
American writers
American academics
Distinguished professors in the United States
University of Virginia faculty